List of films produced in the Cinema of Poland in the 1960s.

External links
 Polish film at the Internet Movie Database

1960